Seth Owens (born 11 November 1998) is an English semi-professional footballer who plays as a defender for  club South Park. He is a product of the Brentford academy and began his professional career with AFC Wimbledon in 2016. After his release in 2018, Owens dropped into non-League football.

Club career

Brentford 
Adept at left back or centre back, Owens began his career with Wingate & Finchley, before joining the academy at Brentford and signing a scholarship deal at the end of the 2013–14 season. He made 43 appearances and scored four goals for the youth team and had a one-month work experience loan at Hayes & Yeading United prior to his release in January 2016.

AFC Wimbledon 
Owens joined the Development Squad at League One club AFC Wimbledon on trial during the 2016–17 pre-season and impressed enough to sign his first professional contract on 9 August 2016. He won his maiden call into the first team squad two months later, for a league match versus Bury on 18 October 2016 and remained an unused substitute during the 2–1 victory. He made his debut with a start in a 2–0 EFL Trophy group stage loss against Newport County on 8 November 2016 and made his league debut versus Bury on 19 November, playing the full 90 minutes of the 5–1 victory. He finished the 2016–17 season with six appearances and was nominated for the club's Young Player of the Year award.

Early in the 2017–18 season, Owens joined National League South club Whitehawk on loan. He made his only appearance for the club with a start in a 1–0 defeat to Concord Rangers on 19 August 2017. Owens' loan was terminated after he sustained a knee injury in training in the days leading up to the Hawks' match with Braintree Town on 26 August. The injury ruled Owens out for the majority of the 2017–18 season. He returned to match play with the Development Squad in mid-April 2018 and was released at the end of the 2017–18 season.

Non-League football 
Prior to the beginning of the 2018–19 season, Owens dropped into non-League football to join Isthmian League North Division club Maldon & Tiptree. After seven appearances, he transferred to Southern League Premier Division South club Staines Town. After just two appearances for Staines Town, Owens moved across the division to Farnborough in late-December 2018. He played through until January 2022, when he joined Isthmian League Premier Division club Leatherhead on dual-registration terms. He ended the 2021–22 season with Combined Counties League Premier Division North club Burnham. In September 2022, Owens transferred to Isthmian League South Central Division club South Park.

Career statistics

References

External links 
 
Seth Owens at evostikleaguesouthern.co.uk
Seth Owens at pitchero.com

Living people
English footballers
1997 births
Association football fullbacks
Association football central defenders
AFC Wimbledon players
Hayes & Yeading United F.C. players
National League (English football) players
English Football League players
Whitehawk F.C. players
Maldon & Tiptree F.C. players
Isthmian League players
Staines Town F.C. players
Southern Football League players
Farnborough F.C. players
Leatherhead F.C. players
Burnham F.C. players
Combined Counties Football League players
South Park F.C. players